Negrophilia: The Album is a studio album by American hip hop musician Mike Ladd. It was released on Thirsty Ear in 2005.

The album features contributions from Guillermo E. Brown, Vijay Iyer, Andrew Lamb, Roy Campbell, and Bruce Grant. It is inspired by Petrine Archer-Straw's book of the same name.

Critical reception

At Metacritic, which assigns a weighted average score out of 100 to reviews from mainstream critics, the album received an average score of 73, based on 11 reviews, indicating "generally favorable reviews".

Andy Kellman of AllMusic gave the album 4 out of 5 stars, calling it "one of Ladd's most accomplished albums to date, proving once again that he's one of the most forward-thinking artists around."

Track listing

Personnel
Credits adapted from liner notes.

 Mike Ladd – vocals, programming
 Guillermo E. Brown – drums, electronics
 Vijay Iyer – piano, organ, synthesizer
 Andrew Lamb – winds
 Roy Campbell – trumpet
 Bruce Grant – tape loop
 Marguerite Ladd – sampler

References

External links
 

2005 albums
Mike Ladd albums
Thirsty Ear Recordings albums